The National Pledge is an oath of allegiance to the Republic of Singapore. It is commonly recited by Singaporeans in unison at public events, especially in schools, in the Singapore Armed Forces and during the National Day Parade.

Origin 
The National Pledge was written by Sinnathamby Rajaratnam in 1966 shortly after Singapore's independence. Rajaratnam revealed that the dream was to build "a Singapore we are proud of". He believed that language, race and religion were divisive factors, but the Pledge emphasises that these differences can be overcome if Singaporeans cared enough about their country. The draft text was handed to the then Prime Minister Lee Kuan Yew, who polished the text before submitting it to the Cabinet.

Guidelines for usage 
The Singapore government's guidelines for the use of the pledge are:

The National Pledge is recited in schools on all school days, either in the morning or afternoon, during SAF Day, during the National Day Parade, and at National Day Observance Ceremonies.
Individuals reciting the Pledge shall clench their right fists to the left side of their chests as a gesture to symbolise loyalty to the nation. 
The Pledge shall not be used for any commercial purposes.

External links 
National Pledge page at National Heritage Board website

Oaths of allegiance
National symbols of Singapore
1966 establishments in Singapore